Altolia is a village of Messina district in northeast of Sicily, southern Italy. At the time of the Istat census of 2011 it had about 200 inhabitants.

The village is located on the border with the municipality of Scaletta Zanclea, on the high hills overlooking the valley of the Giampilieri stream.

History 
At the time of the Norman domination, Altolia became a fief of the Chiaromonte (XII century), whose territory extended to the sea, as the hamlets of Giampilieri and Molino did not yet exist. During the anti-Spanish revolt of Messina of 1674–78, Altolia sided with the Spaniards, also due to the proximity of the fief of Scaletta, whose prince Ruffo was an ally of the latter. During the four years of struggle, the houses and districts of the valley were repeatedly looted and burned, now by the Spaniards and now by the French. In 1678, at the end of the revolt, despite the support given by the Altoliesi to the Spaniards for the achievement of victory, the lands of the valley between Altolia, Molino a Giampilieri were confiscated and put up for sale. Francesco Piccinini bought them on behalf of Don Placido Ruffo, prince of Scaletta and of Floresta, who thus also became "Baron of Artalìa, Molino and Giampilieri". However, in 1727 the land was expropriated and returned by the royal state property. The plague that devastated Messina in 1743 did not affect the village. The various earthquakes that occurred in Messina in 1783, 1854 and 1908 did not particularly damage the town, except for the collapse of the wooden ceiling of the Mother Church. In 1940 the provincial road was built that from Giampilieri Marina leads to the village, passing through Giampilieri Superiore and Molino, replacing the old mule track which along the stream bed reached Altolia.

On 1 October 2009 it jumped to the headlines for the flood and the landslide, which cost 37 victims together with Giampilieri Superiore, Giampilieri Marina, Molino, Briga Marina, Briga Superiore and Scaletta Zanclea.

Infrastructure and public transport 

The village of Altolia can be reached via the provincial road 33 of Altolia which, starting from the Giampilieri Marina junction, crosses Giampilieri Superiore and, passing through the Molino junction, finally reaches the village. The minor viability is represented by alleys and stairways.

Altolia is connected to the city center by two ATM bus lines: shuttle line n ° 2 (Altolia - Giampilieri Railway Station - Briga superiore - Terminal ZIR) and line n ° 1 Shuttle 100 (Giampilieri superiore - Central Railway Station - Torre Faro).

Excursions 

The route is characterized by dense chestnut woods, centuries-old terraces and panoramic windows overlooking the strait. The panorama that embraces the villages of Altolia, Scaletta and Itala is fabulous. In fact, the summit is located exactly on the watershed of three valleys. Downhill there are numerous “dammusi”, ancient millstones with a dome or barrel shaped roof. In some, the pressing tank, the must collection tank and the opening from which the grapes were poured are still visible.

See also 
 2009 northeastern Sicily floods and mudslides

References

Frazioni of the Metropolitan City of Messina